Sayantan Ghosal is an Indian film director and editor in Bengali cinema. He has directed several movies, including Jawker Dhan, Sagardwipey Jawker Dhan, and Satyanweshi Byomkesh. He directed Byomkesh Season 1-Season 3 for the streaming service Hoichoi, and his web series Lalbazaar is currently streaming on ZEE5.

Career 
Ghosal's first film Jawker Dhan was released in 2017. Jawker Dhan was based on the adventure story of the Bimal-Kumar duos of Hemendra Kumar Roy. The film was a massive success at the box office. His second film, Alinagarer Golokdhadha, was released in 2018, and once again produced by Champion Movies. The movie was also successful at the box office. His third film Satyanweshi Byomkesh was released in 2019 under Greentouch Entertainment. The film stars Byomkesh Bakshi as Parambrata Chatterjee and Ajit Bandyopadhyay as Rudranil Ghosh. His fourth film, Sagardwipey Jawker Dhan, was released in 2019 under the banner of Surinder Films and Champion Movies. The film grossed about $1,750,000 at the box office.

He also directs web series, with his most notable and successful web series being Byomkesh and Lalbazaar.

Filmography

Web series and short films

TVCs

Awards and nominations

References

External links 

Indian film directors
Living people
Bengali film directors
1988 births
Hoichoi original programming
Film directors from Kolkata